Heyderia is a genus of fungi in the family Hemiphacidiaceae. The genus contains six species.

The genus name of Heyderia is in honour of Johann Ernst Friedrich Heyder (1765-1797), who was a German doctor and botanist from the 'Universitäts-Chirurgicus' in Göttingen.

The genus was circumscribed by Johann Heinrich Friedrich Link in Tent. Disp. Meth. Fung. (Lipsiae) on page 36 in 1797.

Species
Heyderia abietis
Heyderia agariciphila
Heyderia americana
Heyderia cucullata
Heyderia pusilla
Heyderia sclerotiorum

References

Helotiales